The Portales Main Post Office, on W. 1st St. in Portales in Roosevelt County, New Mexico, was built in 1937.  It was listed on the National Register of Historic Places in 1990 as US Post Office-Portales Main.

It is a one-story red brick building.  

It includes an oil-on-canvas mural by Santa Fe artist Theodore Van Soelen titled "Buffalo Range", executed in 1939 under a New Deal program, the  Federal Works Agency's Section of Fine Arts program.

References

External links

National Register of Historic Places in New Mexico
1937 establishments in New Mexico
Government buildings completed in 1937
Roosevelt County, New Mexico
Murals